Arfeuille-Châtain is a commune in the Creuse department in the Nouvelle-Aquitaine region in central France.

Geography

Population

Sights
 The churches in the two main villages, both dating from the seventeenth century.

See also
Communes of the Creuse department

References

Communes of Creuse